Mediterranean School of Business is a private for-profit business school in Les Berges du Lac, Tunisia. It is part of South Mediterranean University. MSB is the first business school in the French-speaking Tunisia with programs and activities organized in English.  It was legally established in 2004 as a private institution under the Tunisian laws regulating the organisation and functioning of private schools. Its founder and president is Mahmoud Triki and its actual dean is Leila Triki. 

Its Executive MBA Program is the first and only MBA Program in Tunisia accredited by the London-based Association of MBAs (AMBA).
MSB offers its students exchange opportunities and double-master degrees abroad as it partners with different universities all over the world.

MSB developed partnerships and exchange programm with various North American, european, Asian and african universities including the University of South Florida, the Emporia State University, HEC Montreal, IESEG, Libera Università Internazionale degli Studi Sociali Guido Carli, 
Ritsumeikan Asia Pacific University, ESC Rennes School of Business, KEDGE Business School, IESEG, Nova School of Business and Economics, University of Hertfordshire, EM Normandie, Catholic University of Portugal, The American University in Cairo and IE Business School.

MSB students can also obtain a double degree from both SMU and one of its partner universities including the ESC Rennes School of Business, Hult International Business School, ESIC University, HEC Montreal and EADA Business School.

See also 
 List of business schools in Africa
 Tunis Business School
 Education in Tunisia
 List of Arab universities
 List of colleges and universities

References 

Business schools in Africa
Educational institutions established in 2004
Education in Tunis
2004 establishments in Tunisia